See also the 1911 Paris to Madrid air race.

The Paris–Madrid race of May 1903 was an early experiment in auto racing, organized by the Automobile Club de France (ACF) and the Spanish Automobile Club, Automóvil Club Español.

At the time in France there was a great interest in international car races. In 1894 the Paris–Rouen was the first car race in the world, followed by races from Paris to Bordeaux, Marseilles, Dieppe, Amsterdam, Berlin and Vienna.

The organisation

Problems in getting authorizations
The French government was against the idea of races being held on public streets. After the Paris–Berlin race of 1901, the Minister of Internal Affairs M. Waldeck-Rousseau stated that no other races would be authorized.
The Paris–Madrid was strongly supported by King Alphonse XIII of Spain, and French media suggested that France could not withdraw from the competition, being the country with the most advanced technology in car manufacturing.

Baron de Zuylen, president of the ACF, managed to overcome the opposition of Prime Minister Émile Combes by stating that the roads were indeed public, the public wanted the races, and many local administrators were eager to have a race pass through their towns.

Many French car manufacturers supported the request, employing of over 25 thousand workers and producing 16 million Francs per year of export alone. Since races were necessary to promote the brands, they interceded with the government who finally agreed with the race. The Council of Ministries and the President gave their support to the race on February 17, 1903, while the ACF had been accepting applications since January 15.

The setup
In just 40 days over 300 drivers enrolled, many more than expected. The net worth of the cars involved in the race surpassed 7 million Francs.

The race was to span over 1307 kilometers, in three legs: Versailles – Bordeaux (552 km), Bordeaux – Vitoria (km 335) and Vitoria – Madrid (420 km). The rules were published in the three biggest motor sport magazines of France: France Automobile, La Locomotion, La Vie Automobile.

The rules called for four weight categories: less than 250 kg, 250 to 400 kg, 400 to 650 kg and 650 to 1000 kg. The weight was intended as dry weight, excluding the driver, fuel, batteries, oil, spare parts, tools, food and water, driver's luggage, headlights and lights harnesses, horns and eventual external starter.

The subscription cost ranged from 50 to 400 Francs, depending on weight. The two heaviest classes were supposed to have a driver and a mechanic (weighing no less than 60 kg, the same for the whole race), while the two lighter ones required only a driver.

The starting order was drawn at random between the cars enrolled in the first thirty days, and in progression for the drivers enrolled after February 15. The race start was established for the 3.30 AM of Sunday May 24, from Versailles Gardens, les Jardins de Versailles. As in many races before, the cars were to leave one by one, with a two-minute delay.

The "Absolutely Closed Parks" rule was introduced: at the end each race leg, the cars were to be taken by a commissioner to closed pens, where no repairs or maintenance were allowed. Any refueling or repairs had to be done during the race time. While in transit to the pens, the cars had to cross the towns in parade, accompanied by a race officer on a bicycle who was supposed to record the exact time of the crossing, which was later deducted from the overall driver's time. The time records were written on time slips and kept in sealed metal boxes on every car.

While Versailles – Bordeaux was a mainstay of road races (the Gordon Bennett Cup has been kept there in 1901), the Bordeaux – Vitoria leg presented more uncertainty: it was full of sharp turns, climbs, narrow bridges, rail crossings, stone roads and long, paved stretches where high speeds would be possible.

The participants
315 racers enrolled, but only 224 were present on the start line, subdivided as follows:
 88 cars in the heaviest class (650 to 1000 kg)
 49 cars between 400 and 650 kg
 33 voiturettes under 400 kg
 54 motorcycles

Many famous racers and brands joined the race.
René de Knyff, Henri and Maurice Farman, Pierre de Crawhez, Charles S. Rolls were racing with Panhard-Levassor, mighty 4-cylinders cars capable of 70 hp and 130 km/h

Henri Fournier, William K. Vanderbilt, Fernand Gabriel and Baron de Forest enrolled for the Mors brand, who presented a daring new wind-splitting radiator on the classic bateau frames. The car was very powerful, with 90 hp and a maximum speed of almost 140 km/h

Mercedes deployed 11 cars, ranging from 60 to 90 hp. De Dietrich and many other French brands such as Gobron Billiè, Napier and Charron Girardot shunned the lightest classes and raced only with their most powerful and heavy models. The smallest cars from those brands were still present in the hands of amateurs and private racers. Other French brands included Darracq, De Dion-Bouton, Clément-Bayard, Richard, and Décauville.

Renault joined the race with two cars driven by Marcel Renault and Louis Renault, two founders of the brand and experienced drivers.

Italian manufacturer Fiat presented only two cars, but could count on two of the best drivers of the time, Vincenzo Lancia and Luigi Storero.

The public
French newspapers were excited and covered the race with great enthusiasm. The race was presented as the biggest race since the invention of the car, and over 100,000 people managed to reach Versailles at 2 am for the race start. The first hundred of kilometers of the race track were crowded with spectators, and rail stations were swarmed with people trying to reach Versailles.

The crowd and the darkness convinced the organisers to delay the race start by half an hour, and to reduce the delay between cars to just one minute. The day was expected to be very hot, and the officials wanted to avoid the heat of the late morning.

The race

Start line and first checkpoint

The starting point was in front of the Eau des Suisses (Swiss Lake :fr: Pièce d'eau des Suisses) at the gardens of Versailles. In the early morning of May 24, 1903, participants started at one minute intervals for the first leg to Bordeaux via Saint Cyr, Trappes, Coignières, Le Perray, Rambouillet, Chartres, Clayes, Tours, Ruffec, Angoulême, Chevanceaux, Guitres, Libourne. The first car was expected to arrive at Bordeaux around noon.

The soldiers deployed to manage the crowd proved insufficient, and people swarmed the streets. The first racer to leave, Charles Jarrott with his mechanic Bianchi in a 1000 kg, 45 hp De Dietrich, tried to slow down to 40 miles per hour, to give people time to evacuate the road in front of the car, but it only worsened the problem since people just waited longer to move away.

De Knyff on his Panhard-Levassor left second, followed by Louis Renault in a 650 kg, 30 cv Renault. Théry in Décauville (640 kg, 24 cv), another De Diétrich, a Mors, a Panhard and a light Passy Thellier, (400 kg, 16 cv) were the next. The start took until 6.45 a.m, almost three hours.

The race proved to be very difficult for the drivers: the dangers from the crowd added to the thick dust cloud raised by the cars. The weather had been dry for the prior two weeks, and dust covered the roads. Officials watered down just the first kilometer of road, and the short delay between cars worsened the problem. Visibility dropped to just a few meters, and people stood in the middle of the road to see the cars, becoming a persistent danger for the drivers.

After the first control point in Rambouillet, and the second in Chartres the crowd became less dense. Just after Rambouillet, Louis Renault's wild racing style allowed him to overcome both De Knyff and Jarrott, who were struggling for first place but keeping a more prudent stance to avoid the crowd. Thery and Stead followed at distance, while Jenatzy's Mercedes and Gabriel's Mors were leading an incredible recovery, surpassing 25 cars and achieving a spot in the first ten drivers.

Another incredible feat was achieved by Marcel Renault, who started in the 60th position but managed to almost reach the race leaders at the control point of Poitiers.

Outside of the leading positions, the accidents continued throughout the day; cars hit trees and disintegrated, they overturned and caught fire, axles broke and inexperienced drivers crashed on the rough roads.

The finishing line
Louis Renault reached Bordeaux in first place at noon, while Jarrott, who was racing with a defective clutch and was troubled by mechanical problems to the engine and exhaust, arrived half an hour later followed by Gabriel, Salleron, Baras, de Crawhez, Warden, Rougier, Jenatzy and Voigt. All the drivers were physically exhausted: the cars were heavy, and required a great deal of force to maneuver. Dust made their eyes sore, and many of them had issues with the engines and burned their hands while fixing them. Gabriel, who left as 168th and arrived third, was later recognized as the winner when the time slips were tallied up.

A few big names had to withdraw, and news slowly started coming to the finishing line. Vanderbilt broke a cylinder on his Mors, and had to leave the race. Baron de Caters's Mercedes hit a tree, but was unhurt and probably was fixing the car to keep racing.
Lady race car driver Camille du Gast (Crespin) was placed as high as 8th in her 30 hp De Dietrich until she stopped to help fellow driver E. T. Stead (Phil Stead) who had crashed. She finished 45th. Charles Jarrott, who finished fourth overall with his de Dietrich, asserted that Stead would have died if she had not stopped.

Rumours of accidents
News of an accident at Ablis arrived: a woman was hit by a car and injured. This later was found to be false.

Someone started talking about an accident involving Marcel Renault; with his incredibly fast pace he should have already arrived by that time, but was still missing. News arrived stating that he had an accident at Couhé Vérac. He would die 48 hours later, never regaining consciousness.
There is a memorial at the place where his accident occurred on the RN 10 road in the Poitou-Charentes region of France. This monument was destroyed by the Germans during World War II.

Porter's Wolseley was destroyed at a rail crossing where the bar was unexpectedly down. The car hit it and overturned, killing his mechanic. Georges Richard hit a tree in Angoulême, trying to avoid a farmer standing in the middle of the road, and news came that in Châtellerault Tourand's Brunhot had hit spectators while avoiding a child who crossed the road.  A soldier named Dupuy intervened and saved the child, but was killed and the car lost control, killing a spectator.
 
Further south, another car left the road and went into a group of spectators.  Two people were said to be killed in the crowd.

E.T. Stead, (Phil Stead) in the massive De Dietrich, lost control while overtaking another car in Saint-Pierre-du-Palais, and was injured. He was rescued and tended to by the only lady competitor Camille du Gast. The third De Dietrich driven by Loraine Barrow crashed into a tree and was said to have blown up, wounding the driver and killing the mechanic. Barrow had been in bad health before the race, but had to leave nevertheless since the rules forbade a driver change.

Rolls's Panhard-Levassor, Mayhew's Napier, Maurice Farman's Panhard, the Wolseleys of Herbert Austin and Sidney Girling, Béconnais's Darracq all had major technical issues, and had to retire.

Overall, half the cars had crashed or retired, and at least twelve people were presumed dead, and over 100 wounded. The actual count was lower, with eight people dead, three spectators and five racers.

The aftermath

The race is cancelled
The French Parliament reacted strongly to the news of the numerous accidents. An emergency Council of Ministers was called, and the officers were forced to shut down the race in Bordeaux, transfer the cars to Spanish territory and restart from the border to Madrid. The Spanish government denied permission for this, and the race was declared officially over in Bordeaux.

The race was called off, and by order of the French Government the cars were impounded and towed to the rail station by horses and transported to Paris by train. (The cars' engines were not even allowed to be restarted.)

Newspapers and experts declared the "death of sport racing". It was commonly thought that no other races would be allowed, and for many years this was true: there would not be another race on public highways until the 1927 Mille Miglia.

The effects of the race extended to automobile regulations.

Public opinion is mixed
While some newspapers, such as Le Temps, used the disaster in a demagogic way to attack the car fashion and the race world, other (such as la Presse) tried to downplay the issue, stating that just 3 "involuntary" victims, the spectators, had been sacrificed on the "altar of Progress".

La Liberté rejected the call for a ban on sport races, since automobile manufacturing was a source of French pride, and the socialist Petite Republique defended the car as a mean of mass empowerment and freedom from work fatigue.

Le Matin supported the opinion first stated by the Marquis de Dion, that speed races were useless, both as a publicity stunt and as testbed for technological improvement. The only useful races were the endurance and fuel efficiency ones. There was a bit of truth in the opinion that race cars had very little in common with common commercial cars, with their oversized engines and extreme solutions.

A specialized magazine, L'Auto, tried to reach consensus on a new set of rules for sport races; fewer drivers and cars, classes based on speed and power (not just weight), and the public placed far away from the race course.

Inquiry on the causes
The first fair and authoritative analysis came from La Locomotion Automobile, which identified the causes of the disaster. The massacre was due to a few concurrent factors:
 Speed. Cars raced at over 140 km/h, a speed not reached even by the fastest trains of the time.
 Dust, which worsened the driving conditions and was direct cause of a few accidents.
 Excessive and poorly managed public, worsened by an inadequate crowd control and a general underestimation of the danger involved in a car race.

The police force was accused of being more interested in the race than the public safety, forgetting to intervene when people crossed the road or stood in it. The organization was held responsible for poor choices. The random start order was a mess, since faster and more powerful cars were mixed with slower and smaller ones, causing many unneeded overtakings. Some drivers (such as Mouter in the De Dietrich) managed to advance almost 80 places, just because they started far back and had many small cars and amateur drivers ahead. The interval between starts was reduced to one minute only, worsening the dust problem and randomly mixing in motorcycles, voiturettes and race cars.

The rule preventing a driver change before the race start was also under scrutiny. Some drivers, it was said including Marcel Renault, had health problems at the start line but had to race because the brands could not retire a vehicle, and no driver change was possible.

Causes of accidents
The London's weekly magazine The Car verified the death claims, discovering that some of them were only rumours, and investigated the actual causes.

In the Angoulême accident killing the soldier and a spectator, it was discovered that the child was at fault, having crossed the road after escaping his parents.

The accident at the rail cross that occurred to Porter was a fault of the organization, since the cross was not attended. The leading hypothesis about a loss of control due to a mechanical failure was dismissed.

Barrow's car did not blow up, it hit a dog while avoiding another one and crashed into a tree, but did not explode or burn. The idea of an engine exploding had great appeal to the public, but was a product of ignorance and hype.

Marcel Renault's and Stead's accidents were the only true racing incidents, and were both due to the excessive dust impairing visibility during an overtaking. The blame was put on the officers and the rules, and the death toll was deemed surprisingly low given those premises.

Political consequences
French Prime Minister Émile Combes, was accused of being partially responsible, because he agreed to allow the race to proceed. He tried to explain that he did not know cars could be so fast and dangerous.
He claimed to be against any restriction on the automotive makers, and both Parliament and Senate agreed with a formal vote in support of his decision.

Just a few days after the disaster, the newspapers lost interest in the Paris–Madrid race. The sport pages were all about another race, at the Ardennes racetrack the following June 22.

Notes and references

Sources
 Donatella Biffignandi: "Parigi-Madrid 1903. Una corsa che non ebbe arrivo", Auto d'Epoca gennaio 2003
 Paris - Madrid Race of 1903 The race to Death
 

Auto races
1903 in motorsport
Motorsport in Europe
Motorsport in France
Motorsport in Spain
May 1903 sports events